The 220th Coastal Division was an infantry division of the Royal Italian Army during World War II. Royal Italian Army coastal divisions were second line divisions formed with reservists and equipped with second rate materiel. They were often commanded by officers called out of retirement.

History 
The division was activated on 15 April 1942 in Rome by uniting the two coastal defense sectors "Civitavecchia" and "Magliana". The division was assigned to XVII Army Corps and based its headquarter in Santa Severa. The division was responsible for the coastal defense of the coast of northern Lazio between the rivers Chiarone and Astura. The division was also responsible for the defense of the harbor of Civitavecchia and the city of Anzio.

After the announcement of the Armistice of Cassibile on 8 September 1943 the division was disbanded by invading German forces.

Organization 
 220th Coastal Division, in Santa Severa
 111th Coastal Regiment
 3x Coastal battalion
 152nd Coastal Regiment
 3x Coastal battalion
 23rd Coastal Artillery Regiment
 220th Carabinieri Section
 182nd Field Post Office
 Division Services

Attached to the division:
 Harbor Defense Command ​Civitavecchia
 III Dismounted Squadrons Group/ Regiment "Genova Cavalleria"
 IV Dismounted Squadrons Group/ Regiment "Genova Cavalleria"
 CCCXXV Coastal Battalion
 CVIII Coastal Artillery Group

If needed the division would have been reinforced by personnel and units of the following:
 10th Arditi Regiment, in Santa Severa
 III Arditi Battalion
 IV Arditi Battalion
 1x Battalion/ Marine Infantry Regiment "San Marco", in Nettuno (Royal Italian Navy)
 II Training Battalions Group, in Nettuno
 1x Alpini training battalion
 Paratroopers Training Center, in Tarquinia
 1x Paratroopers training battalion
 3rd Infantry Experiences Training Center, in Anzio
 Coastal Recruits School, in Civitavecchia
 Artillery Officer Recruits School, in Cerveteri
 1x Artillery group
 Sapper School, in Civitavecchia
 2x Sapper battalions
 CC.NN. Anti-aircraft School, in Anzio
 Guardia di Finanza Non-Commissioned Officer Recruits School, in Ostia Lido
 Aeronautical Personal Assistance Center, in Ostia Lido (Royal Italian Air Force)
 Telecommunications Personnel Training Center, in Anzio (Royal Italian Air Force)
 Gioventù Italiana del Littorio Pre-military Instructors Center, in Civitavecchia

On 8 September 1943 the XXXIV Coastal Brigade, which had been activated on 16 August 1943 and consisted of four battalions that were still in the process of forming, was assigned to the division.

Commanding officers 
The division's commanding officers were:

 Generale di Brigata Oreste Sant'Andrea (15 April 1942 - September 1943)

References 

 
 

Coastal divisions of Italy
Infantry divisions of Italy in World War II